The Saddle Cyclone is a 1925 American silent Western film directed by Richard Thorpe and starring Jay Wilsey, Harry Todd and  Lafe McKee.

Cast
 Jay Wilsey as Bill Demming 
 Nell Brantley as Alice Roland
 Will Herford as Joshua Lowery
 Norbert A. Myles as Frank Lowery 
 Harry Todd as Andy Simms
 Bob Fleming as Regan
 Lafe McKee as Burns

References

Bibliography
 Connelly, Robert B. The Silents: Silent Feature Films, 1910-36, Volume 40, Issue 2. December Press, 1998.
 Munden, Kenneth White. The American Film Institute Catalog of Motion Pictures Produced in the United States, Part 1. University of California Press, 1997.

External links
 

1925 films
1925 Western (genre) films
1920s English-language films
American silent feature films
Silent American Western (genre) films
American black-and-white films
Films directed by Richard Thorpe
1920s American films